This is a bibliography of advertising.

General
Bhatia, Tej K. 2007. Advertising and marketing in rural India. Macmillan India.
 Bhatia, Tej K. 2000. Advertising in Rural India: Language, Marketing Communication, and Consumerism. Institute for the Study of Languages and Cultures of Asia and Africa. Tokyo University of Foreign Studies. Tokyo Press: Japan. 
 Arthur Richards, Kent US (2008) Teacher, Pirate, renaissance man
 Clark, Eric, "The Want Makers", Viking, 1988. 
 Cook, Guy (2001 2nd edition) "The Discourse of Advertising", London: Routledge, 
 Graydon, Shari (2003) "Made You Look - How Advertising Works and Why You Should Know", Toronto: Annick Press, 
 Johnson, J. Douglas, "Advertising Today", Chicago: Science Research Associates, 1978. 

 Kleppner, Otto, "Advertising Procedure", Englewood Cliffs, N.J., Prentice-Hall, 1966.
 Kotabe, Masaki and Kristiaan Helsen, Global Marketing Management, 3rd Edition, John Wiley & Sopns, Inc, publishers, Copyright 2004, 
 Laermer, Richard; Simmons, Mark, Punk Marketing, New York: Harper Collins, 2007.  (Review of the book by Marilyn Scrizzi, in Journal of Consumer Marketing 24(7), 2007)
 Lears, Jackson, Fables of Abundance: A Cultural History of Advertising in America, Basic Books, 1995, 
 Leon, Jose Luis (1996) "Los effectos de la publicidad". Barcelona: Ariel, 
 Leon, Jose Luis (2001) "Mitoanálisis de la publicidad". Barcelona. Ariel, 
 McFall, Liz, Advertising: A Cultural Economy, Thousand Oaks, CA: Sage Publications Inc., 2004. 
 Mulvihill, Donald F., "Marketing Research for the Small Company", Journal of Marketing, Vol. 16, No. 2, Oct., 1951, pp. 179–183.
 Packard, Vance, The Hidden Persuaders, New York, D. McKay Co., 1957.
 Petley, Julian (2002) "Advertising". North Mankato, Minnesota: Smart Apple Media, 
 Young, Charles E., The Advertising Handbook, Ideas in Flight, Seattle, WA April 2005, 
 Wernick, Andrew (1991) "Promotional Culture: Advertising, Ideology and Symbolic Expression (Theory, Culture & Society S.)", London: Sage Publications Ltd, 
 West, Nancy M. Kodak and the Lens of Nostalgia (2000) Charlottesville: University of Virginia Press

Critics
 Achbar, Mark (editor), Manufacturing consent : Noam Chomsky and the media: the companion book to the award-winning film by Peter Wintonick and Mark Achbar, Montreal; New York: Black Rose Books, 1994. 
 Baines, Paul. (2001) "A Pie in the Face" in Alternatives Journal, Spring 2001 v. 27 i. 2 p. 14. Retrieved: InfoTrac Web: Expanded Academic ASAP plus. (24/07/2002).
 Boiler, David in: Silent Theft. The Private Plunder of Our Common Wealth, Routledge, New York, February 2003, 
 Chomsky, Noam, (edited by Peter R. Mitchell and John Schoeffel) Understanding Power: The Indispensable Chomsky, New York: The New Press, 2002. Cf. "An Exchange on Manufacturing Consent"
 De Certeau, Michel. (1984) The Practice of Everyday Life. Berkeley, London: University of California Press.
 Fraser, Nancy. (2000) "Rethinking the Public Sphere: A contribution to the critique of actually existing democracy" in S. During (ed), The Cultural Studies Reader. London and New York: Routledge.
 Goldman, Debra. (1999) "Consumer Republic" in Adweek.Com, Nov 22, 1999 v36 i47 p13. Retrieved: www.adweek.com (8/08/2002).
 Habermas, Jürgen. (c1989) The Structural Transformation of the Public Sphere: an Inquiry into a Category of Bourgeois Society. Cambridge, Mass.: MIT Press.
 Harkin, James. (1996) "The Logos Fight Back" in New Statesman, June 18, 2001 v130 i4542 p 25. Retrieved: InfoTrac Web: Expanded Academic ASAP plus. (8/08/2002).
 Hodge, R. and Kress, G. (1988) Social Semiotics. Cambridge: Polity Press.
 Holt, D. (2002) "Why Brands Cause Trouble? A dialectical theory of Consumer Culture and Branding" in Journal of Consumer Research, June 2002 v29 i1 p 70(21). Retrieved: InfoTrac Web: Expanded Academic ASAP plus. (29/07/2002).
 Horkheimer, Max and Adorno, Theodor W. (1973) Dialectic of Enlightenment. London: Allen Lane.
 Jhully, Sut. (2006) The Spectacle of Accumulation. Essays in Media. Culture & Politics, Peter Lang Publishing (June 24, 2006), 
 Jhully, Sut (1990) The Codes of Advertising: Fetishism and the political Economy of Meaning, Routledge; 1 edition (December 12, 1990), 
 Jhully, Sut, Leiss, William, Kline, Stephen, Botterill, Jacqueline (2005): Social Communication in Advertising: Consumption in the Mediated Marketplace, Routledge; 3 edition (September 28, 2005), 
 Kilbourne, Jean: Can't Buy My Love: How Advertising Changes the Way We Think and Feel, Free Press; 1 edition (November 2, 2000), 
 Klein, Naomi. (2000) No Logo: Taking Aim at the Brand Bullies. New York: Picador, 
 Korten, David. (1995) When Corporations Rule the World. 2. Edition 2001: Berrett-Koehler, San Francisco, California, 
 Lasch, Christopher. The Culture of Narcissism: American Life in an Age of Diminishing Expectations, Norton, New York, 
 Lasn, Kalle. (2000) Culture Jam: how to reverse America's suicidal consumer binge - and why we must, Harper Paperbacks (November 7, 2000), . 
 Lasn, Kalle. (1999) Culture Jam: The Uncooling of America, William Morrow & Company; 1st edition (November 1999), 
 Lees, Loretta, (1998) "Urban Renaissance and the Street" in Nicholas R. Fyfe (ed) Images of the Street: Planning, Identity and Control in Public Space. London; New York: Routledge.
 Leiss, William: (1990) Social Communication in Advertising, Routledge; 2 edition (July 27, 1990), 
 Lemke, Jay L. (1995) Textual Politics: Discourse and Social Dynamics. London: Taylor & Francis.
 Livingston, Sonia and Lunt, Peter. (1994) Talk on Television: Audience Participation and Public Debate. London & New York: Routledge.
 Louw, Eric. (2001) The Media and Cultural Production. London: Sage Publications.
 McChesney, Robert W., Stolzfus, Duane C. S. and Nerone, John C, (2007) Freedom from Advertising: E. W. Scripps's Chicago Experiment (History of Communication), Univ of Illinois Pr (March 30, 2007)
 McChesney, Robert W. “The Political Economy of Media: Enduring Issues, Emerging Dilemmas”. Monthly Review Press, New York, (May 1, 2008), 
 Prothers, Lisa (1998) Bad.eserver.org, "Culture Jamming: An Interview with Pedro Carvajal" in Bad Subjects: Political Education for Everyday Life, Issue #37, March 1998.
 Rorty, James: Our Master's Voice: Advertising Ayer Co Pub, 1976, 
 Sinclair, Upton (1919): The Brass Check
 Stuart, Ewen. Captains of Consciousness: Advertising and the Social Roots of the Consumer Culture, Basic Books, 
 Williamson, Judith (1994): Decoding Advertisements (Ideas in Progress), Marion Boyars Publishers Ltd (March 1, 1994), 

 Bibliography
advertising